Hageri is a village in Kohila Parish, Rapla County in northwestern Estonia. As of 2011 Census, the settlement's population was 128.

References

Villages in Rapla County
Kreis Harrien